The 1995–96 Icelandic Hockey League season was the fifth season of the Icelandic Hockey League, the top level of ice hockey in Iceland. Three teams participated in the league, and Skautafelag Akureyrar won the championship.

Regular season

Final 
 Skautafélag Akureyrar - Skautafélag Reykjavíkur 2:1 (2:3, 11:4, 7:4)

External links 
 1995-96 season

Icelandic Hockey League
Icelandic Hockey League seasons
1995–96 in Icelandic ice hockey